Bernardsville is a New Jersey Transit station located in Bernardsville, Somerset County, New Jersey along the Gladstone Branch of the Morris & Essex Lines.

History 
Bernardsville station opened on January 29, 1872 with the first New Jersey West Line Railroad train leaving Bernardsville for Summit station.

Station layout
The station building, located on the north side of the tracks, is of stone-masonry construction. It was designed by architect Bradford L. Gilbert. There is a convenience store/deli inside the station building with a large high-ceilinged seating area that was formerly a bank branch. A public restroom and ticket vending machine are available. In 1984 the building was added to the New Jersey Register of Historic Places and the National Register of Historic Places as part of the Operating Passenger Railroad Stations Thematic Resource.

Permitted parking is available at a cost of $377 per year. There are a limited number of hourly parking spots, as well as designated spots that allow free short-term parking after 10 a.m.. A statue of the late Representative Millicent Fenwick stands near the pedestrian entrance to the station parking lot.

The station's one low-level side platform has a walkway across the main track, allowing passengers to reach the outer track.

References

External links

 Station from Google Maps Street View

Bernardsville, New Jersey
Romanesque Revival architecture in New Jersey
Colonial Revival architecture in New Jersey
Railway stations in the United States opened in 1872
NJ Transit Rail Operations stations
Railway stations on the National Register of Historic Places in New Jersey
Former Delaware, Lackawanna and Western Railroad stations
Railway stations in Somerset County, New Jersey
National Register of Historic Places in Somerset County, New Jersey
1872 establishments in New Jersey